John A. Williams (1925–2015) was an African-American author, journalist, and academic.

John A. Williams may also refer to:
 John A. Williams (judge) (1835–1900), American judge
 John Alan Williams (born 1960), American football player
 John Albert Williams (1866–1933), American Episcopal priest, journalist, and activist
 John Allen Williams (born 1945), American political scientist
 John Allen Williams (murderer) or John Allen Muhammad (1960–2009), American murderer

See also 
 John Williams (disambiguation)